

C04A Peripheral vasodilators

C04AA 2-amino-1-phenylethanol derivatives
C04AA01 Isoxsuprine
C04AA02 Buphenine
C04AA31 Bamethan

C04AB Imidazoline derivatives
C04AB01 Phentolamine
C04AB02 Tolazoline

C04AC Nicotinic acid and derivatives
C04AC01 Nicotinic acid
C04AC02 Nicotinyl alcohol (pyridylcarbinol)
C04AC03 Inositol nicotinate
C04AC07 Ciclonicate

C04AD Purine derivatives
C04AD01 Pentifylline
C04AD02 Xantinol nicotinate
C04AD03 Pentoxifylline
C04AD04 Etofylline nicotinate
QC04AD90 Propentofylline

C04AE Ergot alkaloids
C04AE01 Ergoloid mesylates
C04AE02 Nicergoline
C04AE04 Dihydroergocristine
C04AE51 Ergoloid mesylates, combinations
C04AE54 Dihydroergocristine, combinations

C04AF Enzymes
C04AF01 Kallidinogenase

C04AX Other peripheral vasodilators
C04AX01 Cyclandelate
C04AX02 Phenoxybenzamine
C04AX07 Vincamine
C04AX10 Moxisylyte
C04AX11 Bencyclane
C04AX17 Vinburnine
C04AX19 Sulcotidil
C04AX20 Buflomedil
C04AX21 Naftidrofuryl
C04AX23 Butalamine
C04AX24 Visnadine
C04AX26 Cetiedil
C04AX27 Cinepazide
C04AX28 Ifenprodil
C04AX30 Azapetine
C04AX32 Fasudil

References

C04